"Falling onto Mars" is a science fiction short story by Geoffrey A. Landis, published in 2002.  It won the 2003 Hugo Award for Best Short Story.

Plot summary
The story is told from the point of view of a great-great-grandchild of a prisoner exiled to Mars. The narrator gives a brief history of how prisoners came to be sent to Mars in the first place, and then tells the story of Jared Vargas and his wife Kayla.

References

External links 
 

Science fiction short stories
2002 short stories
Hugo Award for Best Short Story winning works
Works originally published in Analog Science Fiction and Fact
Short stories set on Mars
Works by Geoffrey A. Landis